909 Chestnut (formerly One SBC Center, One Bell Center, and One AT&T Center) is a 44-story building in downtown St. Louis, Missouri at 909 Chestnut Street on the Gateway Mall. The building is currently completely vacant.

The building was built to replace the Southwestern Bell Building as the Southwestern Bell world headquarters. However, in a series of mergers the headquarters moved to San Antonio, Texas and was later renamed AT&T.

In 2006 Inland American Real Estate Trust bought the building for $205 million. AT&T then signed a 10-year lease to be the sole tenant.

When AT&T announced, in 2013, that they would be vacating the building in 12 months and that they would be not be renewing the lease when it expired in 2017, the number of employees in that building had fallen from a high of 4,800 to 2,000 through layoffs, outsourcing and remote work.

The building was ultimately foreclosed by US Bank after AT&T's departure and, on April 25, 2022, the building was sold for $4.05 million to SomeraRoad, a New York based developer.

See also
List of tallest buildings in Missouri
List of tallest buildings in St. Louis

References

Office buildings completed in 1986
Skyscraper office buildings in St. Louis
Center (St. Louis)
Telecommunications company headquarters in the United States
HOK (firm) buildings
Downtown St. Louis
1986 establishments in Missouri
Buildings and structures in St. Louis